Ante Režić (born 4 June 1988 in Solin, Croatia) is a Croatian footballer who most recently played for German side USI Lupo-Martini.

Club career
A product of Hajduk Split academy, Režić had several loan spells between 2007 and 2010 at Croatian sides Solin, Junak Sinj, Međimurje and Mosor before debuting for Hajduk in the 2010–11 season under manager Stanko Poklepović.

International career
Režić was also capped 4 times for Croatia under-17s in 2004 and 2005.

References

External links
 
 

1988 births
Living people
People from Solin
Association football defenders
Association football midfielders
Croatian footballers
Croatia youth international footballers
HNK Hajduk Split players
NK Solin players
NK Junak Sinj players
NK Međimurje players
NK Mosor players
HNK Šibenik players
NK Varaždin players
NK Dugopolje players
NK Imotski players
Croatian Football League players
Regionalliga players
Oberliga (football) players
Croatian expatriate footballers
Expatriate footballers in Germany
Croatian expatriate sportspeople in Germany